Jerrold McRae (born April 9, 1955) is a former American football wide receiver. He played for the Kansas City Chiefs in 1978 and for the Philadelphia Eagles in 1979.

References

1955 births
Living people
American football wide receivers
Tennessee State Tigers football players
Kansas City Chiefs players
Philadelphia Eagles players